The 1814–15 United States Senate elections were held on various dates in various states. As these U.S. Senate elections were prior to the ratification of the Seventeenth Amendment in 1913, senators were chosen by state legislatures. Senators were elected over a wide range of time throughout 1814 and 1815, and a seat may have been filled months late or remained vacant due to legislative deadlock. In these elections, terms were up for the senators in Class 1.

The Democratic-Republican Party lost a seat but still retained their overwhelming Senate majority.  Unlike in recent elections, the minority Federalists had gone into the elections with a chance of regaining their long-lost majority had they swept almost all the seats.  However, only one seat switched parties.  Two seats held by Democratic-Republicans were left unfilled until long after the next Congress began.

Change in composition

Before the elections 
Composition after June 1814 special election in New Hampshire.

Result of the regular elections

Race summaries 
Except when noted, number following candidates is whole number votes.

Special elections during the preceding Congress 
In these special elections, the winner was elected during 1814 or before March 4, 1815; ordered by election date.

Races leading to the next Congress 
In these regular elections, the winner was seated on March 4, 1815; ordered by state.

All of the elections involved the Class 1 seats.

Special elections during the next Congress 
In this special election, the winner was elected in 1815 after March 4; ordered by election date.

Connecticut

Delaware

Kentucky (special) 

There were two special elections in Kentucky: one in 1814 and the other in 1815.

Maryland

Massachusetts

Massachusetts (regular)

Massachusetts (special)

New Hampshire (special)

New Jersey

New York

North Carolina (special)

Ohio

Ohio (regular)

Ohio (special)

Pennsylvania

Pennsylvania (special)

Pennsylvania (regular)

Rhode Island

Tennessee

Tennessee (regular)

Tennessee (special, class 1)

Tennessee (special, class 2)

Vermont

Virginia

Virginia (regular)

Virginia (special)

Virginia

See also 
 1814 United States elections
 1814–15 United States House of Representatives elections
 13th United States Congress
 14th United States Congress

Notes 
 Party Division in the Senate, 1789-Present, via Senate.gov

References